Vladimir Aleksandrovich Shatalov (December 8, 1927 – June 15, 2021) was a Soviet and Russian cosmonaut who flew three space missions of the Soyuz programme: Soyuz 4, Soyuz 8, and Soyuz 10. From 1987 to 1991, he headed the Yuri Gagarin Cosmonaut Training Center.

Early life
Vladimir Shatalov was born on December 8, 1927, in Petropavlovsk, Kazak ASSR, Russian Soviet Federative Socialist Republic, Union of Soviet Socialist Republics (now Petropavl, North Kazakhstan Region, Kazakhstan). His father, Aleksandr Borisovich Shatalov (1890–1970), was a railway engineer and an early recipient of the Hero of Socialist Labour. His mother, Zoya Vladimirovna Shatalova (née Nikolskaya; 1900–1980), was a housewife. 

In 1941, Shatalov graduated from the 6th Grade Secondary School No.4 in Leningrad. During his school years, Shatalov was engaged in aircraft modeling in the Pioneers Palace. In 1941, he took part in the Defense of Leningrad for a month and a half, along with his father at the "Svyazrem-1" repair and restoration train. He helped to build the "Road of Life" across the frozen Lake Ladoga. This was the only route into the city during the bitter winters. Shatalov went back to Petropavlovsk, where his family left for evacuation. In 1943, Shatalov graduated from the seven-year school in Petropavlovsk.

Early career 
In early 1945, Shatalov graduated from the 6th Voronezh Air Force Special School, which he was evacuated to Karaganda, followed by Lipetsk. In July 1945, Shatalov entered the 8th Military Aviation School for initial training of pilots. However, in August 1945, the school had closed. Shatalov continued his studies at the Kachinsk Military Aviation School, which was situated in Michurinsk, Tambov Oblast at the time. In 1949, Shatalov graduated from college with first category and became a pilot. From September 7, 1949, Shatalov served as an  instructor pilot, and from June 14, 1951, served as an instructor pilot in piloting techniques of the 706th Training Aviation Regiment of the Kachinsk MAS. From December 12, 1951, Shatalov served as an instructor pilot for the combat use of the 706th TAR.

In 1956, Shatalov graduated from the Command Faculty of the Air Force Academy. From November 1956, Shatalov served as deputy squadron commander, then later — squadron commander, and from May 1960 — deputy commander of an aviation regiment in combat units of the Air Force. From February 1961, Shatalov served as a senior inspector-pilot of the combat training department of the 48th Air Army of the Odessa Military District. Shatalov was a master on multiple aircraft, mostly the Yak and MiG aircraft. The total flight time by the time of enrollment in the cosmonaut corps was more than 2,500 hours.

Cosmonaut career 
Shatalov had dreams of flying even higher, but was worried he may be too old to train as a cosmonaut. When Yuri Gargarin became the first man in space in April 1961, he was a full seven years younger. However, in 1962 Shatalov was asked to nominate the five best pilots under his command for consideration as cosmonauts, and put his own name forward at the top of the list. He passed the medical exam and then the interview in Moscow, which included Gargarin himself on the panel. By order of the Commander-in-Chief of the Air Force No.14 on January 10, 1963, Shatalov was enrolled in the Cosmonaut Training Center as a listener-cosmonaut. From January 1963 to January 1965, Shatalov underwent general space training. He studied the systems, design and operating rules of the spacecraft Vostok ZA, Voskhod, Voskhod 2, and Soyuz. On January 13, 1965, after passing the exams, Shatalov was qualified as an Air Force cosmonaut. On January 23, 1965, 
Shatalov was appointed cosmonaut of the 2nd Detachment (Military Space Programs).

Shatalov has been in space three times. He made his first flight on January 14, 1969, on the Soyuz-4 spacecraft. It was the first to carry out manual rendezvous and docking with Soyuz-5. With his participation, for the first time in the world, an experimental space station was created and the transition through open space of cosmonauts Aleksei Yeliseyev and Yevgeny Khrunov from the Soyuz-5 spacecraft to the Soyuz-4 was carried out. There was no internal connecting corridor between the two craft, and so the crew had to step into space using handrails on the craft in order to carry out the transition. For his part in this feat, he was made a Hero of the Soviet Union and awarded The Order of Lenin.

Later life
From June 25, 1971, Shatalov served as Assistant to the Air Force Commander-in-Chief for Space Flight Preparation and Support (Deputy Air Force Commander for Space). From 1971 to 1991, Shatalov was a member of the State Commission on Manned Space Flights. On April 28, 1972, he defended his dissertation at the Gagarin Academy, and received the degree of candidate of technical sciences. In 1980, Shatalov was a consultant for the science fiction film Per Aspera Ad Astra. From January 3, 1987, to September 19, 1991, Shatalov served as the Commander of the Cosmonaut Training Center. By the decree of the President of the Russian Federation of May 9, 1992, Shatalov was transferred to the reserve on May 21, 1992.

Shatalov was married to Musa Andreyevna Ionova (* 1928), and together they had two children named Igor Vladimirovich Shatalov (* 1952) and Yelena Vladimirovna Shatalova (* 1958).

Shatalov died on June 15, 2021, at age 93. His funeral took place on June 17, 2021, at the Federal Military Memorial Cemetery in Mytishchi, Moscow Oblast.

Honours and awards
Twice Hero of the Soviet Union
No.10713 — (January 22, 1969) 
No.85 — (October 22, 1969) 
Order "For Merit to the Fatherland" 4th class (February 4, 2000)
Order of Friendship (December 4, 2011)
Three Orders of Lenin
No.400926 — (January 22, 1969, awarded to Heroes of the Soviet Union) 
(April 30, 1971) 
(January 15, 1976) 
Order of the October Revolution (December 27, 1982)
Order "For Service to the Homeland in the Armed Forces of the USSR" 3rd class (February 22, 1989) 
Medal "For Battle Merit" (December 30, 1952)
Jubilee Medal "In Commemoration of the 100th Anniversary of the Birth of Vladimir Ilyich Lenin"
Medal "For Distinction in Guarding the State Border of the USSR"
Jubilee Medal "Twenty Years of Victory in the Great Patriotic War 1941–1945"
Medal "Veteran of the Armed Forces of the USSR"
Medal "For Strengthening of Brotherhood in Arms", (May 24, 1982)
Medal "For the Development of Virgin Lands" (~1969)
USSR State Prize (1981)
Pilot-Cosmonaut of the USSR (January 22, 1969)
 (October 21, 1969)
 (1971)
Honorary Metallurgist (July 14, 1972)
Honorary Surveyor (1988)
Several commemoration awards

Foreign awards:
Hero of Labor (Vietnam, 1980)
Order of Ho Chi Minh (Vietnam, 1980)
Order of Karl Marx (GDR, 1977)
Order of Scharnhorst (GDR, September 11th, 1978)
Medal "Brotherhood in Arms" (GDR, 1978)
Order of the Polar Star (Mongolia, 1983)
Medal "Brotherhood in Arms" (Poland) (1977)
Order "Madara Horseman" (Bulgaria) (2008)
Order of the Banner of the People's Republic of Bulgaria 
Medal "100 years of Bulgaria's Liberation from Ottoman Slavery"
Several other awards

A crater on the moon was named after Shatalov.

Honorary citizen of the cities: Kaluga, Kurgan (1969), Nalchik (Russia), Karaganda, Petropavl (Kazakhstan), Prague (Czech Republic), Houston (USA).

References

Further reading 
 J. K. Golovanov, "Korolev: Facts and myths", Nauka, 1994, ;
 «Rockets and people» - B. E. Chertok, M: "mechanical engineering", 1999, - ;
 "Bank of the Universe" - edited by Boltenko A. C., Kiev, 2014., publishing house "Phoenix", 
The official website of the city administration Baikonur - Honorary citizens of Baikonur

1927 births
2021 deaths
1969 in spaceflight
1971 in spaceflight
People from Petropavl
Ninth convocation members of the Supreme Soviet of the Soviet Union
Tenth convocation members of the Supreme Soviet of the Soviet Union
Heroes of the Soviet Union
Honoured Masters of Sport of the USSR
Recipients of the Medal "For Distinction in Guarding the State Border of the USSR"
Recipients of the Order "For Merit to the Fatherland", 4th class
Recipients of the Order "For Service to the Homeland in the Armed Forces of the USSR", 3rd class
Recipients of the Order of Ho Chi Minh
Recipients of the Order of Lenin
Recipients of the USSR State Prize
Russian people of Kazakhstani descent
Soviet Air Force generals
Soviet cosmonauts
Soviet lieutenant generals
Burials at the Federal Military Memorial Cemetery